Rosalía León Oviedo (born July 14, 1974) is a Mexican actress, singer, songwriter and guitarist. She participated in the Mexican musical reality show La Academia. She released her first album through Sony Music in 2003 selling over 50,000 copies in the first four weeks.

Early life
Rosalía León Oviedo was born in Mexico City on July 14, 1974. She is the founder and leader of the guitar project “Gliese 229”, through which she revisits traditional Mexican songs by singing alongside an acoustic guitar and an electric guitar. She also composes.

She studied singing, guitar and guitar crafting, as well as pan flute and crystal flute. She studied techniques of South American rhythmic guitar with Ciro Hurtado and Ruben Izquierdo; music composition with Daniel Barjau; and luthiery at the Liceo Paracho Johrengua in Mexico City.

In August 2018 she recorded a special version of her song “Casi Creo que Aquí te Quedas” along with singer Eugenia León and guitarist Sergio Vallín. Theo shot the video. It is an invitation to Mexico and is based on the projection of representative images of Mexican culture.

On September 13, 2018, she made her solo debut in Havana, Cuba performing at the Teatro del Museo Nacional de Bellas Artes, which featured guest performances of singers Haydeé Milanés and Athanai, with electric guitars by César Huesca, Raúl Verdecia and Dayron Ortiz.

Discography
Oviedo has two albums under her acoustic-electric guitar and voice concept, produced by herself:

 Alegorías (2013) 
 Más Alto (2017) collaboration including Mike Stern, Sergio Vallín, Javier Bátiz, Raúl Fernandez Greñas, Julio Revueltas, Pavel Cal, César Huesca, Susana Harp, Sole Giménez and Kelvis

Reception 
Mas Alto lasted for more than 10 months among the best-selling albums in the genre of World Music in Mexico.

In 2018, on the first anniversary of the release of Más Alto, Oviedo recorded a special version of her song "Casi Creo Que Aquí Que Quedas" with Mexican singer Eugenia León.

References

Sources 
 El Heraldo de Chihuahua (20 August 2018). . By: Carmen Sánchez (In Spanish)
 La Jornada (18 August 2018). . By: Ernesto Márquez (In Spanish)
  
  
 Edo México Político (21 February 2018). «Rosalía León estrena video de "Espectro"». By: Redacción MX Político. (In Spanish)
 Milenio (5 December 2017). «Rosalía León y su peculiar Fusión». By: Hugo García Michel. (In Spanish)
 
 
 
 
 
 
 Starmedia (10 September 2016). «Cantautora Rosalía León finalista en festival musical costarricense». By: Starmedia (In Spanish)

External links 

La Academia Season 2

1974 births
Living people
La Academia contestants
21st-century Mexican singers
21st-century Mexican women singers